The Garner Mill was a historic grist mill and saw mill on Shoal Creek in Lawrenceburg, Tennessee.

The original mill was built in 1820 by James Scott, after the county court gave him permission to establish a mill on Shoal Creek. It had many owners through its history. C. H. Nicholson, who acquired it in 1851, operated it as both a water-powered sawmill and a grist mill. The mill was listed on the National Register of Historic Places in 1984.

Both the mill and the associated dam were destroyed by a major flood on Shoal Creek in July 1998. The property was later removed from the National Register.

References

Grinding mills on the National Register of Historic Places in Tennessee
National Register of Historic Places in Lawrence County, Tennessee
Sawmills in the United States
Buildings and structures completed in 1820
1820 establishments in Tennessee
1998 disestablishments in Tennessee
Buildings and structures destroyed by flooding